Thomas Wilson Spence (September 2, 1846February 23, 1912) was an Irish American immigrant, lawyer, and politician.  He was a member of the Wisconsin State Assembly, representing the city of  during the 1877 and 1879 sessions.  As a young man, he was one of the "Ohio Five", who were among the early students of Cornell University.  Spence rose to legal prominence in Milwaukee, and died of a heart attack in the chambers of the Wisconsin Supreme Court while making oral arguments. "He died with his tie on."

Early life 
Thomas Wilson Spence was born in Dungannon, County Tyrone, Ireland, in September 1846.  He emigrated with his family to the United States in the midst of Án Gorta Mór or the Great Famine of 1845–1848.  His family located at Chillicothe, Ohio, where he was raised and educated.  After completing his common school education, his family relocated to Fond du Lac, Wisconsin, in 1865.  Spence quickly returned to Ohio, however, and attended Ohio Wesleyan University.  After a year, in 1867, he entered Cornell University.  He studied the classical course and graduated as valedictorian in 1870.

While at Ohio Wesleyan, Spence joined the Phi Kappa Psi fraternity and transferred to Cornell with several fraternity brothers.  At Cornell, he was "the fourth founder" of the New York Alpha Chapter of Phi Kappa Psi.  He was also a founding member of Cornell's Irving Literary Society.

Fond du Lac career 
In 1875, he formed a partnership with his former teacher, James Coleman, creating a firm known as Coleman & Spence. That partnership continued until 1880, when Coleman moved to Washington, D.C., to become a partner for U.S. senator Matthew H. Carpenter. Spence formed a new partnership with a recent pupil, Joseph W. Hiner, in a firm known as Spence & Hiner.

While prospering in his legal career, Spence also became active in politics as a member of the Republican Party. He was elected to two terms in the Wisconsin State Assembly, serving in the 1877 and 1879 sessions. He also presided as chairman of the Republican State Convention in 1884.

Quarles, Spence & Quarles 
In 1884, Spence left  and moved to Racine, Wisconsin, to partner with Joseph V. Quarles, whose previous partner, John B. Winslow, had just been elected Wisconsin circuit court judge.  In 1888, they moved to Milwaukee to expand their practice, and admitted Joseph's brother, Charles Quarles, as a third partner.  The firm was then known as Quarles, Spence & Quarles and became one of the leading law firms in Wisconsin.

The firm of Quarles, Spence & Quarles still survives, in some respects, in the 21st century. Borgelt, Powell, Peterson & Frauen S.C. traces its origins to the 1881 firm of Quarles & Winslow, the predecessor of Quarles, Spence & Quarles.  The name of the firm remained Quarles, Spence & Quarles until 1957.

Death 

Two years after counselor Spence's death, it was written in the History of Wisconsin:

Personal life and family 
Thomas Spence married Maria Cornelia Tallmadge, of Granville, Wisconsin, in 1874.  Cornelia was the sixth child of Montgomery Tallmadge and his wife Nancy Ann ( Eastman).  The Tallmadge family was descended from Thomas Talmadge, an English immigrant who came to the Massachusetts Bay Colony in 1631.  The Talmadge family contained many prominent figures in American history, including Cornelia's great grandfather Benjamin Tallmadge, who was a significant spymaster for George Washington during the American Revolutionary War.  Nathaniel P. Tallmadge, who served as governor of the Wisconsin Territory, was a second cousin (twice-removed).

Thomas and Cornelia had one child, Thomas Henry Spence, who graduated from Yale in 1899 and became a partner in his father's law firm.

Electoral history

Wisconsin Assembly (1876) 

| colspan="6" style="text-align:center;background-color: #e9e9e9;"| General Election, November 7, 1876

Wisconsin Assembly (1878) 

| colspan="6" style="text-align:center;background-color: #e9e9e9;"| General Election, November 5, 1878

References 

Republican Party members of the Wisconsin State Assembly
People from Dungannon
Politicians from Fond du Lac, Wisconsin
Irish emigrants to the United States (before 1923)
Cornell University alumni
Wisconsin lawyers
1846 births
1912 deaths
19th-century American politicians
19th-century American lawyers